Oriel Chambers is an office building located on Water Street near the town hall in Liverpool, England. It was the world's first building featuring a metal framed glass curtain wall, which has since become a defining feature of skyscrapers around the world. Designed by architect Peter Ellis and built in 1864, it has been grade I listed due to its outstanding importance.

History
Ellis won the commission for Oriel Chambers by competition and completed it in 1864 as evidenced by the building's inscription A.D. 1864 in the gable. It comprises  of floor space set over five storeys. Ellis managed to maximise the influx of light by employing a grid of oriel windows, which became the building's defining feature. 

Initially, it was not well received. The Builder of 20 January 1866 savaged it:
The plainest brick warehouse in town is infinitely superior as a building to that large agglomeration of protruding plate-glass bubbles in Water Street termed Oriel Chambers. Did we not see this vast abortion – which would be depressing were it not ludicrous – with our own eyes, we should have doubted the possibility of its existence.  Where and in what are their beauties supposed to lie?

But the potential of Ellis's design was not lost on all of his contemporaries. John Wellborn Root studied in Liverpool as a teenaged boy, being sent there by his father to be safe from the American Civil War following the Atlanta Campaign (1864). In all likelihood, he studied the then brand new Oriel Chambers and put the lessons learnt to good use when he developed into an important architect of the Chicago School of Architecture, exporting Ellis' ideas across the Atlantic. Long rows of bay windows (of which oriels are a special type) characterise some of Burnham and Root's 1880s American skyscrapers.

More importantly, Oriel Chambers, and Ellis's building at 16 Cook Street, Liverpool, are amongst the precursors of modernist architecture for another reason. In addition to the extensive use of glass on their facades, both boast metal framed glass curtain walls towards the courtyards which makes them two of the world's first buildings to include this feature. Both buildings rely on H-section iron columns at the perimeter, which support the floors and cladding. Ellis's method for cladding was not adopted by Burnham and Root though: their Monadnock Building of 1891 has its distinctive bay windows still set in load-bearing brickwork. 

Recognising its modernity, unsurprisingly, the critical assessment of Oriel Chambers was far more favourable in the 20th century. Nikolaus Pevsner called it "one of the most remarkable buildings of its date in Europe" and in his earlier book, Pioneers of Modern Design, describes to thus:
The delicacy of the ironwork in the plate-glass oriel windows and the curtain walling at the back with the vertical supports retracted yet visible from outside is almost unbelievably ahead of its time.

Architect Adam Caruso (born 1962) describes Oriel Chambers in near poetic words:
Its membranous windows are almost an expression of the open space of the interior pressing out into the space of the street.

Today
Today the building looks a little different, combining its period architecture with a 1950s extension added after German aerial bombing destroyed a small section during World War II.

In 2006 it was purchased from DCT Developments by Bruntwood for just over £5 million who then spent £750,000 refurbishing the building. Bruntwood sold the building in 2019 to Yakel Property Investment who planned to undertake works to update the building.

The building's primary tenant is a set of barristers' chambers, which have been in occupation in various parts since 1965.

Popular culture
Oriel Chambers and 16 Cook Street were featured in the first episode of the ITV (Granada / Tyne Tees) television series Grundy's Northern Pride, looking at John Grundy's favourite buildings in the north of England, aired on 9 January 2007.

References

See also

Architecture of Liverpool

Grade I listed buildings in Liverpool
Grade I listed office buildings
Chicago school (architecture)